The 2023 Michigan Wolverines baseball team will represent the University of Michigan in the 2023 NCAA Division I baseball season. The Wolverines will be led by head coach Tracy Smith in his first season, are a member of the Big Ten Conference and will play their home games at Wilpon Baseball Complex in Ann Arbor, Michigan.

Previous season
The Wolverines finished the 2022 season 34–28, including 12–12 in conference play, finishing in fifth place in their conference. Following the conclusion of the regular season, the Wolverines won the 2022 Big Ten baseball tournament to receive an automatic bid to the 2022 NCAA Division I baseball tournament, where they lost in the regional final to Louisville.

Preseason
Following the conclusion of the regular season, head coach Erik Bakich accepted the head coaching position at Clemson, after a ten-season run at Michigan which saw the Wolverines win two Big Ten baseball tournament championships and finish runner-up in the 2019 College World Series. On July 3, 2022, Tracy Smith was named head coach of the Wolverines.

Roster

}

Schedule and results
{| class="toccolours" width=95% style="clear:both; margin:1.5em auto; text-align:center;"
|-
! colspan=2 style="" | 2023 Michigan Wolverines Baseball Game Log
|-
! colspan=2 style="" | Regular Season (9–10)
|- valign="top"
|

|-
|

|-
|

|-
|

|-
|- style="text-align:center;"
|

Rankings

References

Michigan
Michigan
Michigan Wolverines baseball seasons